Adilkhan Syrlybayevich Sagindykov (born 26 June 1979) is a Kazakh taekwondo practitioner, who competed in the men's heavyweight category. He picked up a bronze medal in the over-84 kg category at the 1999 World Taekwondo Championships in Edmonton, Alberta, Canada, and attained a fifth-place finish at the 2004 Summer Olympics, representing his nation Kazakhstan.

Sagindykov qualified as a lone taekwondo fighter for the Kazakh squad in the men's heavyweight class (+80 kg) at the 2004 Summer Olympics in Athens, by granting a berth and placing fifth from the Asian Olympic Qualifying Tournament in Bangkok, Thailand. He lost his opening match 2–7 to South Korean taekwondo jin and eventual Olympic champion Moon Dae-sung, but spared elimination by moving abruptly into the repechage bracket for his chance of an Olympic bronze medal. In the repechage, Sagindykov edged out Spain's Jon García in his first playoff before ending his Olympic debut with a fifth-place finish in favor of the referee's decision, following a 2–2 tie with Jordan's Ibrahim Kamal.

References

External links

 

1979 births
Living people
Kazakhstani male taekwondo practitioners
Olympic taekwondo practitioners of Kazakhstan
Taekwondo practitioners at the 2004 Summer Olympics
Taekwondo practitioners at the 1998 Asian Games
Taekwondo practitioners at the 2002 Asian Games
Asian Games medalists in taekwondo
People from Turkistan Region
Asian Games bronze medalists for Kazakhstan
Medalists at the 1998 Asian Games
World Taekwondo Championships medalists
20th-century Kazakhstani people
21st-century Kazakhstani people